Miss Darcy may refer to:

 Georgiana Darcy, fictional character in Pride and Prejudice by Jane Austen
 Mr. Darcy's Daughters, 2003 novel by Elizabeth Aston
 The Revelations of Miss Darcy, Victorian pornography